= Stationhouse =

Stationhouse may refer to:

- Stationhouse (firefighting), a structure or other area set aside for storage of fire extinguishing equipment
- Stationhouse (police), a building which serves as the headquarters of a police force or unit which serves a specific district
- Station building, a building which serves as the structure housing a railroad stop
